The list of shipwrecks in May 1834 includes ships sunk, foundered, wrecked, grounded or otherwise lost during May 1834.

2 May

5 May

7 May

8 May

9 May

10 May

13 May

14 May

17 May

20 May

22 May

23 May

24 May

25 May

26 May

30 May

Unknown date

References

1834-05